The 2018–19 season was Stevenage's fifth consecutive season in League Two and their 43rd year in existence. Along with competing in League Two, the club participated in the FA Cup, EFL Cup and EFL Trophy.

The season covers the period from 1 July 2018 to 30 June 2019.

Competitions

Friendlies
Stevenage announced pre-season fixtures with St Albans City, Portsmouth and St Neots Town on 15 May 2018.

League Two

League table

Results summary

Results by matchday

Matches
On 21 June 2018, the League Two fixtures for the forthcoming season were announced.

FA Cup

The first round draw was made live on BBC by Dennis Wise and Dion Dublin on 22 October.

EFL Cup

On 15 June 2018, the draw for the first round was made in Vietnam.

EFL Trophy

On 13 July 2018, the initial group stage draw bar the U21 invited clubs was announced.

Transfers

Transfers in

Transfers out

Loans in

Loans out

References

Stevenage
Stevenage F.C. seasons